"Father Knows Best" is the ninth episode of the first season of the American television drama series Dexter, which first aired on November 26, 2006 on Showtime in the United States. The episode was written by Melissa Rosenberg and directed by Adam Davidson.

Plot
Dexter learns that Joe Driscoll, his biological father who he assumed had been long dead, has only recently died and left all of his belongings to Dexter, including his house in Dade City. Dexter travels to the house with Rita. Later, Debra  and Rudy  who unbeknownst to her is the Ice Truck Killer  arrive to assist Dexter in cleaning out the house. Dexter suspects Driscoll was murdered. Flashbacks to Dexter's childhood show his questioning his adoptive father Harry about his real parents, learning that Driscoll had donated some of his blood to the young Dexter for surgery. Irma, Driscoll's elderly neighbor, recognizes Rudy as a cable repairman who happened to be Driscoll's last visitor before he died. After Rudy leaves the premises with Dexter and his family, he later returns to the elderly woman's house dressed as the cable repairman. Paul begins to slide back into his old abusive habits when Rita attempts to prevent him from seeing their children.

Back in Miami, Batista is questioned about a shooting incident involving Doakes, who claimed to have fired in self-defense. Dexter's analysis of the blood spatter evidence suggests that the suspect was not shot from where Doakes says he had shot him. Batista decides to report his actual observations, the forensic evidence, and the discrepancies with Doakes' story to Internal Affairs, even though this will brand him as a rat. It turns out that the man Doakes killed was a former Haitian terrorist militia member of the Tonton Macoute, whom he had encountered during a black ops mission overseas. In the end, the situation gets kicked under the rug.

Medical inaccuracies 
In the flashback scene where young Dexter is being wheeled to the operating room, the physician informs him that he is fortunate that his father knows a donor with blood compatible with Dexter's (i.e. AB negative). Although technically AB negative blood is rare (approximately 1% of U.S. population), AB negative blood type patients are in fact able to receive blood from all negative blood types.

References

External links

2006 American television episodes
Dexter (TV series) episodes